Nastätten is a Verbandsgemeinde ("collective municipality") in the Rhein-Lahn-Kreis, in Rhineland-Palatinate, Germany. Its seat is in Nastätten.

The Verbandsgemeinde Nastätten consists of the following Ortsgemeinden ("local municipalities"):

Verbandsgemeinde in Rhineland-Palatinate
Rhein-Lahn-Kreis